Doron Kliger is a Professor of Behavioral Economics and Finance as well as head of the Department of Economics at the University of Haifa.

Kliger holds a PhD Tel-Aviv University (1998) and is Associate Editor of the Journal of Behavioral and Experimental Economics.

References

External links
 

Israeli economists
Year of birth missing (living people)
Living people
Tel Aviv University alumni
University of Haifa alumni
Academic staff of the University of Haifa